The Singles: 1969–1973 is an album by the brother-sister pop duo the Carpenters. A greatest hits collection, it topped the charts in the United States and the United Kingdom and became one of the best-selling albums of the 1970s. Features of this compilation include a newly recorded version of "Top of the World", "Ticket to Ride" and a number of musical introductions and segues between the songs "Superstar", "Rainy Days and Mondays" and "Goodbye to Love", the latter two were sped up in pitch, much to the regret of Richard in subsequent years. It has been certified 7× platinum in the US alone. In the UK, the album reached number 1 for 17 (non-consecutive) weeks. In Canada, the album was in the Top 100 for 33 weeks, and number 21 in the Year-end chart.

Richard gave the album this title because he doesn't like the term "greatest hits" because he felt it was "an overused thing". He continues:

Individuals and groups with two or three hits all of a sudden put them on an album, use filler for the rest and title it "greatest hits". This album contains eleven true hits and it just wasn't slapped together. We've remixed a few, re-cut one and joined a couple of others. It's simply something I believe we owe our audience and ourselves.

Track listing

Notes
"We've Only Just Begun" begins with an excerpt of "(They Long to Be) Close to You" and contains elements of "Superstar."
"Superstar," "Rainy Days and Mondays," and "Goodbye to Love" are continuously mixed.

Personnel
Bernie Grundman, Richard Carpenter – 1999, 2014 SACD and SHM CD remastering at Bernie Grundman Mastering
Richard Carpenter - 1991 remastering

EP
US 7" promo (1973); A&M LLP 238
"Ticket to Ride" (1973 version)
"(They Long to Be) Close to You"
"We've Only Just Begun"
"Top of the World"
"Rainy Days and Mondays"

Charts

Weekly charts

Year-end charts

Certifications and sales

References

Albums produced by Jack Daugherty (musician)
The Carpenters compilation albums
1973 compilation albums
1973 EPs
A&M Records compilation albums